Zobahan Freeway is a freeway in Greater Isfahan Region, Isfahan Province, Central Iran, connecting Isfahan to its southwestern suburbs and Esfahan Steel Company (known as Zobahan in Persian) where the freeway gets its name from.

Route

Freeways in Iran
Transport in Isfahan
Transportation in Isfahan Province